A tracking transmitter broadcasts a radio signal which can be detected by a directional antenna (typically a Radio Direction Finder.)
By rotating the antenna one can determine the direction the signal lies in and of course whatever it may be attached to.  The EPIRB is an example of a similar device.

It is commonly used in model rocketry and remote control aircraft to locate lost equipment.

See also
 Homing beacon
 Emergency locator beacon

External links
1.5 volt example transmitter

Wireless transmitters